Majan University College in Muscat, Oman, is located on a single campus in Darsait which is home to a multi-cultural academic community with more than a hundred multi-ethnic staff from various countries and a student population of over 3,500. Majan is an accredited College to the University of Bedfordshire, UK and operates under the supervision of the Ministry of Higher Education, Oman. It offers undergraduate programmes in Business Administration with 7 pathways, Finance, Accounting, Marketing, Internet & Computer Applications, Networking and English Language delivered in both full time and part time mode.

History
Majan was established in 1995 as the first private College in Oman, going on to develop a suite of degrees and master's degrees and cementing its reputation as a leading higher education provider.  More recently, in December 2017, Majan achieved full institutional accreditation from the Oman Academic Accreditation Authority (OAAA) – the first higher education institution in the country to do so.

Academic affiliation
Majan University College has been affiliated with the University of Bedfordshire, United Kingdom, since 1998 and offers the majority of their undergraduate, postgraduate and executive degree programmes through it.

Courses
Masters Courses
 MBA
 MSc in Computer Science
 MA in International Human Resource Management
 MA in Applied Linguistics

Undergraduate Courses
 BA (Hons) Business Administration (specialist pathways available)
 BA (Hons) Marketing
 BA (Hons) Accounting
 BA (Hons) Islamic Banking and Finance
 BA (Hons) Finance
 BSc (Hons) Computer and Internet Applications
 BSc (Hons) Networking
 BA (Hons) English Language

Foundation Programme

Majan Training Institute
The college also runs short courses in the areas of Accounting, Finance, Information Technology, Marketing, English Language and Leadership. These courses are run by ‘Majan Training Institute’ which is part of the college.

Campus
Majan is currently expanding its campus in Darsait to include a new five-storey building which will house equipped classrooms, laboratories, an auditorium with the capacity to accommodate 500 people and a cafeteria. The construction of the project was due to be finished in 2016.

References

1995 establishments in Oman
Educational institutions established in 1995
Colleges in Oman
Universities and colleges in Muscat, Oman
University of Bedfordshire